Juana Rosario Arrendel (born 16 June 1978 in La Romana) is a female high jumper from the Dominican Republic.

Arrendel originally won the 1999 Pan American Games in Winnipeg, but lost the gold medal after testing positive for stanozolol. In 2006, she became the sixth woman to win three Central American and Caribbean Games titles in a row. The other are Miguelina Cobián, Carmen Romero, Bárbara Hechevarría, María Caridad Colón and Letitia Vriesde.

Her personal best jump is 1.97 metres, achieved in December 2002 at the Central American and Caribbean Games in San Salvador. This is the current Dominican Republic record.

Achievements

See also
List of doping cases in athletics

References

1978 births
Living people
People from La Romana, Dominican Republic
Dominican Republic female high jumpers
Olympic athletes of the Dominican Republic
Athletes (track and field) at the 1996 Summer Olympics
Athletes (track and field) at the 2004 Summer Olympics
Pan American Games gold medalists for the Dominican Republic
Athletes (track and field) at the 1999 Pan American Games
Athletes (track and field) at the 2003 Pan American Games
Athletes (track and field) at the 2007 Pan American Games
Doping cases in athletics
Dominican Republic sportspeople in doping cases
Pan American Games medalists in athletics (track and field)
Central American and Caribbean Games gold medalists for the Dominican Republic
Competitors at the 1998 Central American and Caribbean Games
Competitors at the 2002 Central American and Caribbean Games
Competitors at the 2006 Central American and Caribbean Games
Central American and Caribbean Games medalists in athletics
Medalists at the 1999 Pan American Games
Medalists at the 2003 Pan American Games